Laval-des-Rapides may refer to:
Laval-des-Rapides
Laval-des-Rapides (provincial electoral district), a provincial district in Montreal
Laval Centre, an abolished federal district, was known as Laval-des-Rapides between 1976 and 1990